Subsonica are an Italian rock band formed in Turin in 1996. Their eponymous debut album was released in the spring of 1997. The band gained significant success in 2000 by playing at the Sanremo Music Festival. The first two singles from the album Microchip emozionale, "Tutti i miei sbagli" ("All my mistakes") and "Discolabirinto" ("Discolabyrinth") were hits.

In their career they have produced 8 studio albums and sold nearly around 400,000 CDs.

Their latest studio album, Mentale Strumentale, was released in 2020.

Personnel 
Current members
 Samuel Umberto Romano – vocals, guitars
 Massimiliano Casacci – vocals, guitars
 Davide Dileo – vocals, keyboards, piano, programming
 Enrico Matta – drums, percussion, programming
 Luca Vicini – bass, guitars
Former members
 Pierpaolo Peretti Griva – bass

Discography

Studio albums

 Subsonica (1997)
 Microchip Emozionale (1999)
 Amorematico (2002)
 Terrestre (2005)
 L'Eclissi (2007)
 Eden (2011)
 Una Nave in una Foresta (2014)
 8 (2018)
 Microchip Temporale (2019)
 Mentale Strumentale (2020)

Live albums
 Coi piedi sul palco (1998)
 Controllo del livello di rombo (2003)
 Terrestre live ed altre disfunzioni (2006)

Compilation albums
 Nel vuoto per mano (2008)

EPs
 Anomalia Subsonica (2003) (came out included with the official biography of the band)
 Il diluvio remixato (2011)

Video albums
 Cielo tangenziale ovest (2003)
 Be human: cronache terrestri - tour 2005 - 2006 (2006)

References

External links
Official site
https://www.youtube.com/subsonica
Review of Eden(in English)

Italian rock music groups
MTV Europe Music Award winners
Musical groups from Turin
Musicians from Turin